The German 273rd Reserve Panzer Division was a reserve army division. After the Battle of Kursk the German 273rd Reserve Panzer Division was used for augmenting of 11th Panzer Division, whereas their remaining forces were shifted to the Italian front.

Organization 
Organization of the Division in 1943 (when it was formed):

 Headquarters - Under Lieutenant general Helmuth von der Chevallerie
 25th Reserve Panzer Battalion
 35th Reserve Panzer Battalion
 92nd Reserve Panzergrenadier Regiment
 73rd Reserve Motorized Grenadier Regiment
 167th Reserve Artillery Battalion
 7th Reserve Panzer Reconnaissance Battalion
 7th Reserve Tank Destroyer Battalion
 10th Reserve Tank Destroyer Battalion
 19th Reserve Panzer Engineer Battalion
 Reserve Panzer Division Supply Group

References

Bibliography
 

German panzer divisions
Military units and formations disestablished in 1945